Nancy Chelangat Koech is a visually impaired Kenyan Paralympic athlete. She represented Kenya at the 2016 Summer Paralympics in Rio de Janeiro, Brazil, and she won the silver medal in the women's 1500 metres T11 event. She also won the bronze medal in the same event at the 2020 Summer Paralympics in Tokyo, Japan.

At the 2019 World Para Athletics Championships held in Dubai, United Arab Emirates, she won the bronze medal in the women's 1500 metres T11 event.

References

External links 
 

Living people
Year of birth missing (living people)
Place of birth missing (living people)
Paralympic athletes with a vision impairment
Athletes (track and field) at the 2016 Summer Paralympics
Athletes (track and field) at the 2020 Summer Paralympics
Medalists at the 2016 Summer Paralympics
Medalists at the 2020 Summer Paralympics
Paralympic athletes of Kenya
Paralympic silver medalists for Kenya
Paralympic bronze medalists for Kenya
Paralympic medalists in athletics (track and field)
Kenyan female middle-distance runners